Lucy Elizabeth Harris (born 19 October 1990) is a former British Conservative Party politician. She was elected as a Brexit Party Member of the European Parliament (MEP) for the Yorkshire and the Humber constituency in the 2019 European parliamentary election. She held this role until the United Kingdom's withdrawal from the EU. Prior to her political career, she worked in publishing as a corporate communications executive for The Quarto Group, and later the Greater London Authority.

Early life and career
Harris was born on 19 October 1990 in Ipswich, Suffolk. She grew up in Suffolk but lived in Italy for two years, learning Italian while there. Her early education was at Farlingaye High School in Woodbridge, Suffolk, where she was part of the senior choir. She studied classical singing at the Guildhall School of Music and Drama and City, University of London, and completed a master's degree in Publishing at University College London. Harris has worked as a corporate communications executive for The Quarto Group, and as a press officer for the GLA Conservatives. She has also performed solo soprano at the Royal Albert Hall.

Political career
Harris voted for Brexit in the 2016 United Kingdom European Union membership referendum and said that this was the first time that she had voted for anything, as she felt that the EU was undemocratic and corrupt. In November 2018, she founded Leavers of Britain, a social club for Brexit supporters in the United Kingdom. Harris created the club as a safe space for Brexit supporters who she felt were being vilified for their views; she previously claimed to have been vilified by a fellow commuter on the Tube, who allegedly labelled her "stupid" and "racist" because she was carrying a bag with an anti-EU slogan. Harris has written pro-Brexit articles for the British internet magazine Spiked.

She stood as a candidate for the Brexit Party in the 2019 European parliamentary election. She was second on her party's list, and was elected as one of three  of its MEPs for the Yorkshire and Humber constituency. In a BBC Radio 5 Live interview prior to the EU parliamentary elections, Harris suggested that leaving the EU would have a "short-term" negative effect on the economy, which she estimated to last for "30 years" but that it was a cost worth paying for regaining sovereignty and democracy. She was a member of the Committee on International Trade and was part of the delegation to the EU–Chile Joint Parliamentary Committee in the European Parliament.

On 5 December 2019, Harris resigned her party's whip and became an independent MEP. She did so in order to support the Conservative Party in the December general election. Harris later became a Conservative MEP in January 2020, and held this role until the United Kingdom's withdrawal from the EU.

Personal life
Harris was said in 2019 to be in a relationship with Hugh Bennett, at the time a special adviser to the then Leader of the House of Commons, Jacob Rees-Mogg.

References

External links
 European Parliament biography

1990 births
Living people
Brexit Party MEPs
MEPs for England 2019–2020
21st-century women MEPs for England
Alumni of City, University of London
Alumni of University College London
Conservative Party (UK) MEPs
Politicians from Suffolk